In astronomy, a photometric system is a set of well-defined passbands (or optical filters), with a known sensitivity to incident radiation. The sensitivity usually depends on the optical system, detectors and filters used. For each photometric system a set of primary standard stars is provided.

A commonly adopted standardized photometric system is the Johnson-Morgan or UBV photometric system (1953). At present, there are more than 200 photometric systems.

Photometric systems are usually characterized according to the widths of their passbands:
 broadband (passbands wider than 30 nm, of which the most widely used is Johnson-Morgan UBV system)
 intermediate band (passbands between 10 and 30 nm wide)
 narrow band (passbands less than 10 nm wide)

Photometric letters 
Each letter designates a section of light of the electromagnetic spectrum; these cover well the consecutive major groups, near-ultraviolet (NUV), visible light (centered on the V band), near-infrared (NIR) and part of mid-infrared (MIR).

The letters are not standards, but are recognized by common agreement among astronomers and astrophysicists.

The use of U,B,V,R,I bands dates from the 1950s, being single-letter abbreviations. With the advent of infrared detectors in the next decade, the J to N bands were labelled following on from near-infrared's closest-to-red band, I.
Later the H band was inserted, then Z in the 1990s and finally Y, without changing earlier definitions. Hence, H is out of alphabetical order from its neighbours, while Z,Y are reversed from the alphabetical – higher-wavelength – sub-series which dominates current photometric bands.

Combinations of these letters are frequently used; for example the combination JHK has been used more or less as a synonym of "near-infrared", and appears in the title of many papers.

Filters used 
The filters currently being used by other telescopes or organizations.

Units of measurements:
 Å = Ångström
 nm = nanometre
 μm = micrometre

See also 
 Photometry
 AB magnitude

References and footnotes

External links 
 Johnson, H. L.; Morgan, W. W. (1953), Fundamental stellar photometry for standards of spectral type on the revised system of the Yerkes spectral atlas, The Astrophysical Journal, vol. 117, pp. 313–352 
 The Asiago Database on Photometric Systems
 Michael S. Bessell (2005), STANDARD PHOTOMETRIC SYSTEMS, Annual Review of Astronomy and Astrophysics vol. 43, pp. 293–336
 Infrared portrait of the nearby massive star-forming region IRAS 09002-4732, Apai, D.; Linz, H.; Henning, Th.; Stecklum, B., 2005